Lobogenesis lobata is a species of moth of the family Tortricidae. It is found in Costa Rica and Panama, but the Genera Lobogenesis is found in South America.
Lobogenesis Lobata is very similar to L. larana and L. magdalenana, the only distinguishing character is the paired throns from the middle of the transtilla.

The length of the forewings is 5.5 mm for males and 5 mm for females. The forewings are whitish, with tan overscaling. The hindwings are whitish grey with slightly darker grey-brown mottling.

References

Moths described in 1990
Euliini
Moths of Central America
Taxa named by Józef Razowski